The 1979 Welwyn Hatfield District Council election took place on 3 May 1979 to elect members of Welwyn Hatfield District Council in England. This was on the same day as the 1979 general election and other local elections.

At the election, the Labour Party regained control of the council that they had lost following the 1976 election.

Summary

Election result

References

Welwyn Hatfield
Welwyn Hatfield Borough Council elections
1970s in Hertfordshire